Andy Dunn (born February 20, 1979) is an American entrepreneur and the co-founder of Bonobos Inc. Dunn served as CEO for eleven years after co-founding the Bonobos brand in 2007. In June 2017, Walmart announced it was purchasing the Bonobos brand for $310 million in cash. Dunn joined Walmart after the purchase to lead the company's collection of direct-to-consumer brands.

Career

Early years 
Dunn was a consultant for Bain & Company in the US and Latin America following college. His time at Bain included consulting for catalog-based retailer Lands’ End, which served as inspiration for the direct-to-consumer business and customer service model of Bonobos. Afterwards, Dunn worked as a private equity analyst at Wind Point Partners before business school.

Bonobos 
Started by Stanford graduate students Andy Dunn and Brian Spaly, Bonobos was created with the goal to provide men with better-fitting men's pants and a better shopping experience by building the brand on the internet. The company launched with pants that eliminate "Khaki Diaper Butt” and now offers a full line of menswear, including shirts and suits.  Bonobos pioneered the internet-driven direct to consumer (DTC), or digitally native vertical brand (DNVB), retail model. The company launched online and was exclusive online for the first few years. It was the first American brand to use the web as the primary means of story-telling, service, commerce and distribution. The innovation led to the birth of an ecosystem, largely based in New York City, of DTC brands, including Warby Parker, Harry's, Glossier, Allbirds, and Away. Core to the idea of DTC brands is bundling product and service together to drive a higher NPS customer experience than legacy brick-and-mortar driven competition can deliver. To deliver the experience, Bonobos created a customer service team in 2008, the Ninjas, located at the Manhattan headquarters of the company. The Ninjas became a key part of the Bonobos experience in serving customers.

Guideshops 
In 2011, the company invented a new retail model: apparel stores as fit-to-ship showrooms. The innovation resulted from an experiment in the lobby of the company's headquarters in the Flatiron District of New York. The stores enabled the company to deliver long-tail assortment of size, color, pattern and fit without having to stock inventory. The small footprint stores are called Guideshops, and are an innovation made possible because the core engine of distribution for the brand is on the web. Without inventory in the store, the company's associates, the Guides, are able to focus on customer service. As of 2019, the company had 65 Guideshops.

Investors 
The company raised over $100 million in venture capital from investors including Lightspeed, Accel, Forerunner, and Nordstrom. The founding angel investors in the company are Joel Peterson and Andy Rachleff. Lightspeed and Accel co-led the Series A round. At exit, the Board included Jeremy Liew from Lightspeed, Sameer Gandhi from Accel, and Kirsten Green from Forerunner.

Red Swan 
In 2011 Dunn cofounded the angel investment firm, Red Swan, which is focused on investing in consumer retail and consumer internet companies.

Education 
Dunn graduated from Northwestern University in 2000 with a bachelor's degree in economics and history. He earned his M.B.A. from Stanford Graduate School of Business in 2007.

Personal life 
Dunn grew up in Chicago alongside his sister, Monica Royer, founder of Monica + Andy. His mom, Usha Ahuja Dunn, is an immigrant from India and his father, Charles Dunn, is the author of The Nurse and the Navigator, a World War II memoir of the wartime romance of his parents.

In 2017, Dunn married Manuela Zoninsein, a Brazilian immigrant and sustainability entrepreneur. Dunn and Zoninsein live in Chicago.

In 2022, Dunn went public with  his battle with bipolar disorder, including being hospitalized at Bellevue Hospital in 2016.

Awards and recognition 
 Crain’s New York Business 40 under 40 list in 2013.
Forbes's 40 under 40 in 2018.
Mover and Shaker of New York's startup scene, Entrepreneur magazine, 2013.
Sexiest CEOs Alive, Business Insider.
100 People Transforming the World of Business, Business Insider.

References

External links 
 Bonobos: Andy Dunn - How I Built This, NPR radio,  21 January 2019.  Accessed 16 February 2020.

1979 births
Living people
Northwestern University alumni
Stanford Graduate School of Business alumni
American retail chief executives
20th-century American Jews
21st-century American Jews